The Women's 30 kilometre freestyle at the FIS Nordic World Ski Championships 2009 was held on 28 February 2009 at 13:00 CET.

Results

References

External links
Final results (FIS)

FIS Nordic World Ski Championships 2009
2009 in women's sport